Tercidina (minor planet designation: 345 Tercidina) is a large main-belt asteroid. It is classified as a C-type asteroid and is probably composed of carbonaceous material.

It was discovered by Auguste Charlois on 23 November 1892, in Nice.

Size
Via asteroid occultations:

Observations of an occultation of a bright 5.5 magnitude star on 17 September 2002, produced seventy-five chords indicating an ellipsoid of 111×90 km.

Observations of an occultation on 15 November 2005, near Grass Valley, California, produced five chords indicating an incomplete outline of 126×111 km.  This larger result may be caused by a different orientation of the asteroid as it passed in front of the star.

References

External links 
 
 

000345
Discoveries by Auguste Charlois
Named minor planets
000345
000345
18921123